Deal or No Deal has a version airing in Tunisia, called Dlilek Mlek (دليلك ملك), which is broadcast on the Tunisian National television channel Tunisian TV 1 and was hosted by Sami Fehri between 2005 and 2007. It is in Arabic. The top prize was 300,000 Tunisian dinars (about US$124,000) in the first edition, 500,000 dinars (US$206,000) in the second, 1,000,000 dinars (US$412,000) in the third and current versions and 2,000,000 dinars (US$830,000) during Ramadan 2017. The lowest prize is 100 milimes (0.1 dinar, about 7¢ US). The 24 boxes represent 24 governorates of Tunisia.

The top prize was won at least once in each edition. On March 22, 2006, Mohamed Mabrouk won 300,000 dinars. On November 13, 2006, Mohamed Bashir Menchari won 500,000 dinars. And on September 13, 2007, a contestant won 1,000,000 dinars. Each winner shared the prize with an SMS participant.

Revival of the show is broadcast in every Ramadan on El Hiwar Ettounsi since 2014. In Ramadan 2017, the top prize is further increased to 2,000,000 dinars (US$824,000).

On June 13, 2017, Mrs. Aichoucha from Ben Arous won the top prize. However, the episode is under investigation by Independent High Authority for Audiovisual Communication (French: Haute autorité indépendante de la communication audiovisuelle).

On 5 March 2018 and 9 March 2018, two people won the bottom prize of 100 millimes with 5 episodes of each other.

List of seasons

El Hiwar Ettounsi

Box Values

NOTE: The lowest value is shown as 0.1 dinar on the board, but 100 millimes in box. Also, 1,000,000 dinars is written as "Milliard", meaning "billion" in box and 2,000,000 dinars is written as "2 Milliards" ( 2), meaning "2 billion".

References

External links
Official site (El Hiwar Ettounsi) 

Tunisia
Television in Tunisia
2005 Tunisian television series debuts
2007 Tunisian television series endings
2000s Tunisian television series